The Routledge Encyclopedia of Philosophy is an encyclopedia of philosophy edited by Edward Craig that was first published by Routledge in 1998. Originally published in both 10 volumes of print and as a CD-ROM, in 2002 it was made available online on a subscription basis. The online version is regularly updated with new articles and revisions to existing articles. It has 1,300 contributors providing over 2,000 scholarly articles.

Single-volume editions
Two single-volume editions of the encyclopedia have been published, The Concise Routledge Encyclopedia of Philosophy, first published in 1999, and The Shorter Routledge Encyclopedia of Philosophy, first published in 2005.  The Concise version has the same number of entries as the ten-volume set, each entry in the Concise version being the summary of the topic that precedes each article in the 10-volume work.  The Shorter version has over 900 articles, each with more in depth coverage than the corresponding entry (if present) in the Concise encyclopedia.

See also
Encyclopedia of Philosophy
Stanford Encyclopedia of Philosophy
Routledge Encyclopedia of Modernism
List of online encyclopedias

References

External links
Routledge Encyclopedia of Philosophy

British online encyclopedias
Encyclopedias of philosophy
Publications established in 1998
Routledge books
21st-century encyclopedias